MŠK Slovan Trenčianske Teplice is a Slovak football team, based in the town of Trenčianske Teplice.

Current squad

Colours
Club colours are green and yellow.

External links
Club website 
  
Club profile at Futbalnet.sk

References

Football clubs in Slovakia
Association football clubs established in 1921
1921 establishments in Slovakia